Atwima Nwabiagya North District is one of the forty-three districts in Ashanti Region, Ghana. Originally it was formerly part of the then-larger Atwima Nwabiagya District on 17 February 2004; until the northern part of the district was split off to create Atwima Nwabiagya North District on 15 March 2018; while the remaining part has been renamed as Atwima Nwabiagya Municipal District when it was elevated to municipal district assembly status on that same year. The district assembly is located in the western part of Ashanti Region and has Barekese as its capital town.

References

Sources
 
 GhanaDistricts.com

Districts of Ashanti Region